Sonal Mansingh (born 30 April 1944) is an Indian classical dancer and Guru Bharatanatyam and Odissi  dancing style. She has been nominated by the President of India to become a Member of Parliament, Rajya Sabha. She is the youngest recipient of Padma Bhushan in 1992 and Padma Vibhushan in 2003.

Early life and background
Sonal Mansingh was born in Mumbai, second of three children to Arvind and Poornima Pakvasa, a noted social worker from Gujarat and Padma Bhushan winner in 2004. Her grandfather was Mangal Das Pakvasa, a freedom fighter, and one of the first five Governors of India.

She started learning Manipuri dance at age four, along with her elder sister, from a teacher in Nagpur, then at age seven she started learning Bharatnatyam from various gurus belonging to the Pandanallur school, including Kumar Jayakar in Bombay

She has "Praveen" and "Kovid" degrees in Sanskrit from Bharatiya Vidya Bhavan and B.A. (Hons) degree in German Literature from Elphinstone College, Bombay.

Though, her real training in dance started when at age 18, despite her family's opposition, she went to Bangalore, to learn Bharatanatyam from Prof. U. S. Krishna Rao and Chandrabhaga Devi at age 18, abhinaya from Mylapore Gowri Ammal, and later started learning Odissi from Guru Kelucharan Mohapatra in 1965.

Mansingh was married to former Indian diplomat Lalit Mansingh. The couple decided to divorce later. Her father-in-law Mayadhar Mansingh introduced her to Kelucharan Mohapatra where she had her training in Odissi.

Career
Sonal Mansingh dancing career which started in 1962, after her arangetram in Mumbai, and in 1977, she founded, Centre for Indian Classical Dances (CICD) in New Delhi.

Over the years, dance has taken her all over the world and brought her many awards, including the Padma Bhushan (1992), Sangeet Natak Akademi Award in 1987,  and the Padma Vibhushan, India's the second highest civilian award, in 2003; making her the second woman dancer in India to receive such an honour after Balasaraswati. This was followed by Kalidas Samman of Madhya Pradesh government, in 2006 and on 21 April 2007, she was conferred with Doctor of Science (Honoris Causa) by G.B. Pant University, Uttarakhand at Pantnagar and Doctor of Literature (Honoris Causa) by Sambalpur University.

To mark the completion of her 40 years in dancing in 2002, noted Hindi film director, Prakash Jha made a documentary film on her, title Sonal, which also won the National Film Award for Best Non-Feature Film for the year.

In 2018, she was honoured with Sangeet Natak Akademi Fellowship also known as Akademi Ratna, for her contribution in the field of performing arts.

Choreographies
 Indradhanush
 Manavatta
 Mera Bharat
 Draupadi
 Gita Govinda
 Sabras
 Chaturang
 Panchkanya
 Devi Durga
 Aatmayan
 Samanavaya

Awards
Youngest recipient of Padma Bhushan in 1992 and in 2003
Youngest recipient of Padma Vibhushan in 2003.
In November 2019, Sonal Mansingh felicitated with Lifetime Achievement Award.

Quotes
"A dancer is not just a dancer. He/She is part of this environment. He/She does not exist in a vacuum. Society and its happenings have an impact on all individuals, especially artists. If an art form does not reflect the existing milieu, it stagnates."
 "Radha is a grand image too but she's a personification of love without which there is no creation. In our male-dominated mythology the image of Krishna at the feet of Radha, begging for her love, is most unusual. Gita Govind invokes deep spiritual thoughts, packaged in beautifully written verses".

Bibliography
 The Penguin Book of Indian Dance by Sonal Mansingh, Penguin Books Australia. .
 Classical Dances by Sonal Mansingh, Avinash Pasricha, Varsha Das. 2007, Wisdom Publications. .
 Draupadi, by Sonal Mansingh; Museum Society of Bombay, 1994.

  Devpriya conversation with Sonal Mansingh by Yatindra Mishra; Vaani publication.

Further reading
 Sonal Mansingh Contribution to Odissi Dance by Jiwan Pani. 1992, Centre for Indian Classical Dances. .
 Bharata Natyam: Indian Classical Dance Art, by Sunil Kothari. MARG Publications, 1979. Page 169-170.

See also
 Indian women in dance

References

India’s 50 Most Illustrious Women by Indra Gupta

External links

1944 births
Living people
Teachers of Indian classical dance
Recipients of the Sangeet Natak Akademi Award
Recipients of the Padma Bhushan in arts
Recipients of the Padma Vibhushan in arts
Odissi exponents
Indian female classical dancers
Performers of Indian classical dance
Indian classical choreographers
Indian women choreographers
Indian choreographers
Bharatiya Janata Party politicians from Maharashtra
Dancers from Maharashtra
20th-century Indian dancers
20th-century Indian educators
20th-century Indian women artists
Women educators from Maharashtra
Educators from Maharashtra
Women artists from Maharashtra
20th-century women educators
Recipients of the Sangeet Natak Akademi Fellowship